Alexis Souahy (born 13 January 1995) is a professional footballer who plays as a defender for Union Omaha of the USL League One. Born in France, he represents the Comoros national team.

Early life

Personal
Souahy was born in Montreuil, Seine-Saint-Denis, France to Yolaine Souahy. When he was thirteen he moved to Le Havre to join Le Havre AC's academy and attended senior high school at Lycée Saint-Joseph. While at Le Havre AC's academy he made an appearance for their B team in 2013; helping the academy team to fourth-place finishes in both the U-19 National Championship and the Championnat de France amateur 2 Championship.

College and youth
Souahy was originally accepted to play college soccer at Bowling Green State University only to be ruled ineligible for Division I soccer by the NCAA when his international credits didn't transfer. Instead he played one year of soccer at Division II Notre Dame College in South Euclid, Ohio. In his one year at Notre Dame he started all 17 of the team's regular season matches and played 1,584 minutes out of an available 1,592. He scored two goals during the season. The first on 13 September 2014, against Wheeling Jesuit University and the second on 20 September against West Virginia Wesleyan. He also played all 90 minutes of Notre Dame's lone NCAA tournament match.

After a year at Notre Dame Souahy transferred to Bowling Green State University and played three more years of college soccer from 2015 to 2017. His first goal as a falcon came on 3 November 2015, against Appalachian State University and was the only goal of his sophomore season.  As a junior he contributed two more goals and an assist and was named a MAC top 20 player by Top Drawer Soccer. His senior season he was named a team captain and scored three goals with two assists including a goal in the final home match of the season.  After the season he was named to the All MAC second team, All Great-Lakes region third team, and All-Ohio first team. During his three years in Bowling Green Souahy made 55 appearances for the Falcons, scoring six goals and tallying five assists. He started every match and played all available minutes save 29 seconds.

While at college, Souahy played with USL PDL side Michigan Bucks in both their 2016 and 2017 seasons. During the 2016 season he appeared in twelve of Michigan's fourteen regular season matches scoring two goals as Michigan won the PDL's Central Conference Great Lakes Division championship. In the PDL Playoffs Souahy played in two of Michigan's four matches as Michigan won the PDL Championship. During the 2017 season he appeared in all fourteen of Michigan's regular season matches as Michigan repeated as PDL Central Conference Great Lakes Division champions scoring one goal. He also played in Michigan's lone PDL Playoffs match. During the 2017 Souahy appeared in two of Michigan's U.S. Open Cup matches including defeating professional side Indy Eleven of the NASL.

Club career
On 15 January 2018, Souahy signed his first professional contract with United Soccer League side Louisville City FC. After a preseason injury he would make his professional debut on 22 April against Atlanta United 2. Starting the match in place of an injured Pat McMahon. He appeared in 19 of Louisville's 34 league matches including 11 of Louisville last 17 as he slowly became a starter as the season progressed. He scored his first professional goal on 9 September against Pittsburgh and scored three goals during league competition. He also made his first appearance in the U.S. Open Cup as a professional when he was brought on as a substitute against the Long Island Rough Riders. He went on to appear in two of Louisville's five U.S. Open Cup matches without scoring as Louisville reached the quarter finals of the competition for the first time in its history. Souahy also appeared in all four of Louisville's USL Cup playoff matches as he and Louisville went on to win the USL Cup Final against Phoenix.

Following the 2021 season, Louisville opted to decline their contract option on Souahy.

Souahy signed a contract for the 2022 season with USL Championship side New Mexico United on 28 December 2021. 

On 14 February 2023, Souahy signed with USL League One side Union Omaha.

Personal life
Born in France, Souahy is of Comorian descent.

Honours
Louisville City FC
USL Cup: 2018

References

External links 
 Alexis Souahy at Louisville City FC

1995 births
Living people
French footballers
French sportspeople of Comorian descent
Le Havre AC players
Notre Dame Falcons men's soccer players
Bowling Green Falcons men's soccer players
Flint City Bucks players
Louisville City FC players
Association football defenders
USL League Two players
USL Championship players
French expatriate footballers
Expatriate soccer players in the United States
French expatriate sportspeople in the United States
New Mexico United players
Union Omaha players
Comorian expatriate footballers
Comorian expatriates in the United States
2021 Africa Cup of Nations players